Mark Twain Middle School can refer to:
Mark Twain School for the Gifted and Talented in Brooklyn, New York
Mark Twain Middle School in Mar Vista, Los Angeles
Mark Twain Middle School (Virginia)